Jaruco is a municipality and town in the Mayabeque Province of Cuba.

Geography
The town is located in the east of Havana, between San José de las Lajas and Santa Cruz del Norte. The municipality borders with Habana del Este (municipal borough of Havana), Santa Cruz del Norte, Madruga and San José de las Lajas.

The Escaleras (stairs) of Jaruco rise up out of the plains and provide views of the area. The area is protected as a park and is a visiting spot from Havana and the beaches.

History
Jaruco was founded in 1762 under the name San Juan Bautista de Jaruco (Ciudad Condal de San Juan Bautista de Jaruco). "Ajaruco" was the pre-Columbian Taíno name of the settlement.

In 1940, the municipality was divided into the barrios of Arroyo Vuelto, Casiguas, Castilla, Ciudad de Jaruco, Don Martín, Escaleras de Jaruco, Bainoa, San Antonio de Río Blanco del Norte and Santa Ana.

After 1959 this area was grouped into the Regional San José (with the small municipalities of Jaruco, San Antonio-Caraballo (formerly part of pre 1959 Aguacate municipality), Bainoa, etc.) Later Jaruco was the capital of Regional Bainoa which included the municipalities of Jaruco, Camilo Cenfuegos, Santa Cruz del Norte, Aguacate y Madruga.

Since 1976, the Jaruco municipality includes: Jaruco, Caraballo, San Antonio de Rio Blanco del Norte, Bainoa, Casiguas, Vista Alegre, Escaleras de Jaruco (and its beautiful park inside the mountains), Castilla y Tumba Cuatro.

In 2009 the Benedictines being a Roman Catholic congregation started to erect an own residence in Jaruco. The project failed in 2010 because of lack of water so that the Benedictines remained in their provisorial house in Havana (2011).

Demographics
In 2004, the municipality of Jaruco had a population of 25,658.

Notable natives and residents
Oribe - Celebrity hairdresser and entrepreneur

See also

Jaruco Municipal Museum
Municipalities of Cuba
List of cities in Cuba

References

External links

Populated places in Mayabeque Province